Smile! (Улыбнись!, Ulybnis!) is a Russian album by Vitas (Витас), released in 2002. Several songs from this album featured in his Philosophy of Miracle concert programme, whose performance at the Kremlin earned Vitas a record as the youngest artist to perform a solo concert at the State Kremlin Palace; a DVD of this concert was later released.

The title track won the Russian Golden Gramophone and People's Hit awards.

"Good-bye" was released as a single, which included 5 different mixes of the song, the tracks "Ave Maria" and "Byelorussia", and the music video for "Opera #1" from his previous album Philosophy of Miracle. "Good-bye" is notable for Vitas' extreme bass vocals, in contrast to his more usual high-pitched vocals. "Blessed Guru" (sometimes translated "Blissful Guru") also exercises his seldom-used bass range. The song titles "Good-bye" and "Do Svidaniya" (Russian: "До свидания", usually listed in English as "See You Later", as in the track listing here) can cause some confusion because the latter is often translated as "Goodbye".

It also includes Vitas' rendition of "Ave Maria" by Franz Schubert with a contrasting hellish operatic ending; a shortened version without this ending was included in Vitas' 2010 compilation album Masterpieces of Three Centuries.

References

External links
 Official Site
 Vitas on Facebook
 Vitas' producer on Facebook
 Amazon reviews
 English translations of lyrics

Vitas albums